The Viceroy of Portugal was the political chief of the Kingdom of Portugal and the highest representative of the King of Portugal during the period of the Iberian Union, when a personal union existed between the monarchies of Portugal and Spain.

History
 
According to what was established in the Cortes of Tomar in 1581, the regency of the Kingdom of Portugal always had to be trusted by the king to a Portuguese, or in alternative to a member of the Royal Family. This was, in a general way, fulfilled, having during two periods the regency been trusted to a governmental council called Government Junta of the Kingdom of Portugal.

List

See also 
Iberian Union
Council of Portugal

Sources 
October 2009+05:53:11  Virreinato de Portugal

Iberian Union